"One institution with two names" is an arrangement where a Chinese government agency or Chinese Communist Party (CCP) organization has two official names for political or bureaucratic reasons. For example, one name can be used domestically and another used when dealing with institutions outside China. The arrangement can be achieved by either "adding a name" or "externally reserving a name".

Adding a name 
An organization can acquire an additional name when it is responsible for multiple duties or uses an additional name when dealing with foreign institutions. Such organizations usually do not have separate leadership or staff because of additional names.

Externally reserving a name 
"Externally reserving a name" is when an organization that has absorbed another can continue to use said organization's name for bureaucratic purposes. For example, the United Front Work Department (UFWD) uses the name of the Overseas Chinese Affairs Office (OCAO), which it absorbed in 2018, when making statements related to overseas Chinese affairs. In this case, the organization may have a separate nominal leadership team for the reserved name organization, that concurrently can also serve in the leadership of the bigger organization (e.g. Chen Xu both officially serves as the director of the OCAO and a deputy head of the UFWD). In some cases, the reserved name organization can seemingly retain their internal structures (i.e. the China National Space Administration seemingly has a large internal structure and is a reserved name for the Ministry of Industry and Information Technology).

Examples 
According to scholar Anne-Marie Brady, the State Council Information Office is an example of a "public face" for "foreign propaganda work" of the Central Propaganda Department of the Chinese Communist Party.

Examples of one organization with two names:

 Central Military Commission of the Chinese Communist Party and the Central Military Commission of the People's Republic of China
 Cyberspace Administration of China and Office of the Central Cyberspace Affairs Commission
 Taiwan Affairs Office of the State Council and Taiwan Work Office of the Central Committee of the Chinese Communist Party
 Hong Kong Liaison Office and Hong Kong Work Committee of the Central Committee of the Chinese Communist Party
 Macau Liaison Office and Macau Work Committee of the Central Committee of the Chinese Communist Party
 All-China Federation of Industry and Commerce and All-China Chamber of Industry and Commerce
 China Institutes of Contemporary International Relations and the 11th Bureau of the Ministry of State Security

Examples of externally reserving a name:

 National Religious Affairs Administration (reserved by the United Front Work Department)
 Overseas Chinese Affairs Office (reserved by the United Front Work Department)
 State Council Information Office (reserved by the Central Propaganda Department)
 National Press and Publication Administration (reserved by the Central Propaganda Department)
 National Copyright Administration (reserved by the Central Propaganda Department)
 China Film Administration (reserved by the Central Propaganda Department)
 Chinese Academy of Governance (reserved by the Central Party School of the Chinese Communist Party)

See also 
 Organization of the Chinese Communist Party

References 

 
Politics of China
Propaganda in China
Organization of the Chinese Communist Party